The 1st Vanier Cup was played on November 20, 1965, at Varsity Stadium in Toronto, Ontario, and decided Canada's university football champions by way of a national invitation to participate in the game. The Alberta Golden Bears and the Toronto Varsity Blues were invited by a national panel to compete in a single elimination game to decide the Canadian college football champion for the 1965 season. The Varsity Blues won the game for their first ever championship by defeating the Golden Bears by a score of 14-7.

References

External links
 Official website

Vanier Cup
Vanier Cup
1965 in Toronto
November 1965 sports events in Canada
Canadian football competitions in Toronto